Aspergillus westlandensis is a species of fungus in the genus Aspergillus. It is from the Circumdati section. The species was first described in 2014. It has been reported to produce aspergamide A and B, penicillic acid, dehydropenicillic acid, xanthomegnin, viomellein and vioxanthin and traces of ochratoxin A.

Growth and morphology

A. westlandensis has been cultivated on both Czapek yeast extract agar (CYA) plates and Malt Extract Agar Oxoid® (MEAOX) plates. The growth morphology of the colonies can be seen in the pictures below.

References 

westlandensis
Fungi described in 2014